Ana Rosa Quintana Hortal (Madrid, 12 January 1956) is a Spanish journalist and television presenter.

She studied journalism in the Complutense University of Madrid, and started in radio programs (Radio Nacional de España, Radio Continental, Radio 80, Antena 3 Radio) before starting in television.

She authored a novel in 2000 titled Sabor a hiel ("A Taste of Bile"); she was accused of plagiarism and, as a result, the publishing house retired the book from the market.

She had a son with her first husband in 1986, and twins with her current husband in 2004.

TV
El programa de Ana Rosa (2005-), Telecinco.
Sabor a ti (1998–2004), Antena 3
Extra Rosa (1997–1998) with Rosa Villacastín, Antena 3.
Veredicto (1994–1995), Telecinco.
Telediario (1982–1983), TVE.

References

External links

 El Programa de Ana Rosa

1956 births
Living people
Spanish women writers
Spanish journalists
Spanish women journalists
Spanish television personalities
Spanish television presenters
People from Madrid
Complutense University of Madrid alumni
Spanish women television presenters